Mutumwa Dziva Mawere (born January 11, 1960 in Bindura, Zimbabwe), is a Zimbabwean-South African businessman with interests in mining, manufacturing and agro industries, financial services (banking and insurance), telecommunications, publishing, investment holdings, transport and logistics, and international trading, among others. He has created businesses and turned around enterprises that have become Pan African and global players, most notably Africa Resources Limited (ARL) which was one of the most powerful and influential corporations in Zimbabwe's history.

Background 

Mawere was educated in Zimbabwe, Swaziland, the United Kingdom and the United States, obtaining a Master of Science (Management) and an MBA (Finance & Investments) degree. Among his first employers were the Industrial Development Corporation of Zimbabwe and the Merchant Bank of Central Africa. In 1988, he joined the World Bank, where he rose to become a Senior Investment Officer with the International Finance Corporation. In 1995, he became a resident of South Africa, obtaining citizenship in 2002.

Business empire 
In 1996, he acquired Zimbabwe's sole asbestos mining company Shabanie Mashaba Mines (SMM), branching out through all of Zimbabwe's economy. His rise was accompanied by allegations of improper support by politicians from the ruling Zimbabwe African National Union - Patriotic Front (ZANU-PF), especially in connection with government guarantees for a US$60 million loan used in the purchase of SMM. Mawere denied these claims, saying that purchase payments were guaranteed for by a deposit of shares of the mining company instead.

Demise of business empire 
In 2004, Mawere's business empire came under government scrutiny, and allegations of prejudicing the state of more than Z$300 billion were raised by the authorities. In May, Zimbabwean authorities asked for Mawere's extradition from South Africa, but failed. Since then, by presidential decree major parts of his businesses came under government control. According to Mawere, his businesses' funds were used to repay due International Monetary Fund bonds.

Columnist 
Since his businesses were seized, Mawere has written a number of articles about the situation in Zimbabwe, starting with his own situation and a vindication of his past business deals. His op-eds have appeared in several online news websites that cater to Zimbabweans scattered across the world.

See also 
Gideon Gono
Jonathan Moyo

References

External links 
Mawere's blog
Mawere's Official Website

Zimbabwean businesspeople
Living people
1960 births
People with acquired South African citizenship
Rhodesian people
South African businesspeople
Zimbabwean emigrants to South Africa